Pinnacle Creek is a tributary of the Guyandotte River,  long, in southern West Virginia in the United States.

Pinnacle Creek's entire course and drainage area are in southern Wyoming County.

According to 1992 data from the United States Geological Survey, approximately 96% of the Pinnacle Creek watershed was forested; approximately 1% was used for agriculture; and approximately 2% was used for commercial or mining purposes.

See also
List of rivers of West Virginia

References 

Rivers of West Virginia
Tributaries of the Guyandotte River
Rivers of Wyoming County, West Virginia